Ourapteryx caecata is a moth of the family Geometridae. It is found in Taiwan.

The wingspan is 42–50 mm.

References

Moths described in 1911
Ourapterygini
Moths of Taiwan